Ministry of Foreign Affairs and Expatriates of the Syrian Arab Republic is a cabinet ministry of Syria, responsible for conducting foreign relations of the country.

History 

The responsibilities of the Ministry of Expatriates were merged on April 14, 2011.

Foreign ministers 

The following is a list of foreign ministers of Syria since 1920:

Arab Kingdom of Syria (1918–1920)
(1920)       Awni Abd al-Hadi
(1920)       Abd al-Rahman Shahbandar
(1920)       Alaa ad-Din ad-Durubi

French Mandate for Syria (1920–1946)
(1936–1939)  Saadallah al-Jabiri
(1939)       Fayez al-Khoury
(1939)       Khalid al-Azm
(1941–1943)  Fayez al-Khoury
(1943)       Naim Antaki
(1943–1945)  Jamil Mardam Bey
(1945)       Mikhail Ilyan
(1945–1946)  Saadallah al-Jabiri

Syrian Republic (1946–1958)
(1946–1947)  Naim Antaki
(1947–1948)  Jamil Mardam Bey
(1948)       Muhsin al-Barazi
(1948–1949)  Khalid al-Azm
(1949)       Adil Arslan
(1949)       Muhsin al-Barazi
(1949)       Nazim al-Kudsi
(1949–1950)  Khalid al-Azm
(1950–1951)  Nazim al-Kudsi
(1951)       Khalid al-Azm
(1951)       Faydi al-Atassi
(1951)       Shakir al-As
(1952–1953)  Zafir ar-Rifai
(1953–1954)  Khalil Mardam Bey
(1954        Faydi al-Atassi
(1954)       Izzat Sakkal
(1954–1955)  Faydi al-Atassi
(1955)       Khalid al-Azm
(1955–1956)  Said al-Ghazzi
(1956–1958)  Salah al-Din Bitar

United Arab Republic (1958–1961)

Syrian Arab Republic (1961–present)
(1961)       Maamun al-Kuzbari
(1961)       Izzat al-Nuss
(1961–1962)  Maaruf al-Dawalibi
(1962)       Adnan Azhari
(1962)       Jamal al-Farra
(1962–1963)  Assad Mahassen
(1963)       Salah al-Din Bitar
(1963–1965)  Hassan Mraywed
(1965–1966)  Brahim Makhous
(1966)       Salah al-Din Bitar
(1966–1968)  Brahim Makhous
(1968–1969)  Muhammad Eid Ashawi
(1969–1970)  Mustapha al-Said
(1970–1984)  Abdul-Halim Khaddam
(1984–2006)  Farouk al-Sharaa
(2006–2020)  Walid Muallem
(2020–present) Faisal Mekdad

See also
President of Syria
List of presidents of Syria
Vice President of Syria
Prime Minister of Syria
List of prime ministers of Syria
Speaker of the People's Assembly of Syria
Cabinet of Syria

References

Foreign ministers
Foreign Affairs
Diaspora ministries